Robert Fleßers (born 11 February 1987) is a German former professional footballer who played as a full-back or defensive midfielder.

Club career
Fleßers first club was home town club 1. FC Viersen 05 before Borussia Mönchengladbach spotted and signed him. He joined Borussia Mönchengladbach's senior team in 2005. On 22 April 2006 he made his debut in the Bundesliga in a 2–2 draw with Hertha BSC. On 2 May 2008, he announced his departure from Borussia Mönchengladbach and signed a contract with 1. FSV Mainz 05 on 4 June 2008. After only one year with FSV Mainz 05 he joined FC Ingolstadt 04. After a half year in Ahlen, Fleßers joined Wuppertaler SV Borussia. He spent two years with Wuppertal, leaving in July 2013 after the club were relegated from the Regionalliga West, and signing for Rot-Weiß Oberhausen.

International career
Fleßers has played in German national youth teams and the U21.

References

External links
 

1987 births
Living people
People from Viersen
Sportspeople from Düsseldorf (region)
German footballers
Footballers from North Rhine-Westphalia
Association football fullbacks
Association football midfielders
Germany under-21 international footballers
Bundesliga players
2. Bundesliga players
3. Liga players
Regionalliga players
Borussia Mönchengladbach II players
Borussia Mönchengladbach players
1. FSV Mainz 05 players
FC Ingolstadt 04 players
Rot Weiss Ahlen players
Wuppertaler SV players
Rot-Weiß Oberhausen players
21st-century German people